Sita Gurung is a Nepalese politician, belonging to the Nepali Congress currently serving as the member of the 2nd Federal Parliament of Nepal. In the 2022 Nepalese general election, she won the election from Tehrathum 1 (constituency).

References

Living people
Nepal MPs 2022–present
Members of the 1st Nepalese Constituent Assembly
Members of the 2nd Nepalese Constituent Assembly
1975 births